, provisional designation , is a highly eccentric trans-Neptunian object from the scattered disc in the outermost part of the Solar System, approximately 330 kilometers in diameter. It was discovered on 26 March 2001, by American astronomer Marc Buie at Kitt Peak National Observatory in Arizona, United States.

Orbit and classification 

 is a scattered-disc object which belong to the most distant and coldest objects in the Solar System and are thought to be source of most periodic comets.

It orbits the Sun at a distance of 34.3–420.2 AU once every 3425 years and 4 months (1,251,096 days). Its orbit has an eccentricity of 0.85 and an inclination of 31° with respect to the ecliptic. A first precovery was taken by the Sloan Digital Sky Survey in March 1999, extending the body's observation arc by 2 years prior to its official discovery observation at Kitt Peak.

Planet Nine coorbital 

If a massive trans-Neptunian object exists, like hypothetical Planet Nine,  may be co-orbital with it.

Physical characteristics

Spectra and colors 

's color has extensively been measured. The object has a determined BR and IR spectra, which are intermediate classes of the very blue BB and very red RR spectra.

Diameter and albedo 

According to astronomer Michael Brown and based on radiometric observations,  measures 336 kilometers in diameter and its surface has an (assumed) albedo of 0.05. Observations with the PACS-instrument of the Herschel Space Observatory during a survey of scattered-disc objects ("TNO are cool") found a similar diameter of 332 kilometer with an albedo of 0.046. The Collaborative Asteroid Lightcurve Link assumes a higher albedo of 0.10 and consequently derives a much shorter diameter of 222 kilometers based on an absolute magnitude of 6.38. Brown considers  to be possibly a dwarf planet (see list).

Lightcurve 

No rotational lightcurve of  has been obtained from photometric observations. The body's rotation period, pole axis and brightness amplitude remains unknown.

Numbering and naming 

This minor planet was numbered by the Minor Planet Center on 4 May 2004. As of 2018, it has not been named.

See also 
 List of Solar System objects by greatest aphelion

References

External links 
 List Of Centaurs and Scattered-Disk Objects, Minor Planet Center
 Discovery Circumstances: Numbered Minor Planets (80001)-(85000) – Minor Planet Center
 
 

082158
082158
Discoveries by Marc Buie
20010326